Piazza Dante may refer to:

Piazza Dante, Catania
Piazza Dante, Genoa
Piazza Dante, Grosseto
Piazza Dante, Naples
Piazza Dante, Pisa
Piazza Dante, Rome
Piazza dei Signori, Verona, also known as Piazza Dante